Crassispira propeangulosa is an extinct species of sea snail, a marine gastropod mollusk in the family Pseudomelatomidae, the turrids and allies. Fossils have been found in Eocene strata in Picardy, France.

References

 Cossmann (M.), 1889 Catalogue illustré des coquilles fossiles de l'Éocène des environs de Paris (4ème fascicule). Annales de la Société royale Malacologique de Belgique, t. 24, p. 3-385

External links
 Pacaud J.M. & Le Renard J. (1995). Révision des Mollusques paléogènes du Bassin de Paris. IV- Liste systématique actualisée. Cossmanniana. 3(4): 151-187

propeangulosa
Gastropods described in 1889